The Property Institute of New Zealand (PINZ) was formed in 2000.  With over 2800 members throughout New Zealand and scattered throughout the world, the Property Institute membership includes valuers, property and facilities managers, property advisors, and plant and machinery valuers.

PINZ is involved in a review of the Valuers Act 1948.

References

External links
 Property Institute website

Professional associations based in New Zealand
Professional valuation organizations